The 2016 European Lacrosse Championship was the 10th edition of the European Lacrosse competition for national teams. It was played in Budapest, Hungary from 28 July to 6 August 2016.

Draw
The draw was held in Budapest on 10 January 2016.

The four first qualified teams (England, Ireland, Sweden and Netherlands) were placed directly into groups A to D respectively. The other 20 teams were divided into five pots according to its position in the 2012 European Championship.

Preliminary round

Group A

Group B

Group C

Group D

17th to 24th position bracket

9th to 16th position bracket

Tournament bracket

Final standings

References

External links
Official website
Results

2016
2016 in lacrosse
2016 in Hungarian sport
2016 European Lacrosse Championship
2016 European Lacrosse Championship
July 2016 sports events in Europe
August 2016 sports events in Europe
2016 European Lacrosse Championship